A supercombinator is a mathematical expression which is fully bound and self-contained. It may be either a constant or a combinator where all the subexpressions are supercombinators. Supercombinators are used in the implementation of functional languages.

In mathematical terms, a lambda expression S is a supercombinator of arity n if it has no free variables and is of the form λx1.λx2...λxn.E (with n ≥ 0, so that lambdas are not required) such that E itself is not a lambda abstraction and any lambda abstraction in E is again a supercombinator.

See also 
 Lambda lifting

References
S. L. Peyton Jones, The Implementation of Functional Programming Languages. Prentice Hall, 1987.

Functional programming
Implementation of functional programming languages
Lambda calculus